Torodora lineata is a moth in the family Lecithoceridae. It was described by Kyu-Tek Park in 2002. It is found in Thailand.

The wingspan is about 13.5 mm. The forewings are pale greyish orange in the upper half, with two blackish longitudinal fascia from the base to near the tornus along the submedian groove, with two dark discal spots at the middle and at the end of the cell.

Etymology
The species name refers to the transversal lines on the forewings and is derived from Latin linea.

References

Moths described in 2002
Torodora